Horatio Wallace Knapp (March 31, 1869 in Mooers, Clinton County, New York – April 4, 1929 in St. Petersburg, Pinellas County, Florida) was an American politician from New York.

Life
He was a merchant in Mooers, and later also engaged in banking, and electric power supply.

Knapp was Supervisor of the Town of Mooers for several terms beginning in 1899, and Chairman of the Board of Supervisors of Clinton County in 1901 and 1902.

He was a member of the New York State Assembly (Clinton Co.) in 1903, 1904, 1905 and 1906; and of the New York State Senate (30th D.) in 1907 and 1908.

Sources
 Official New York from Cleveland to Hughes by Charles Elliott Fitch (Hurd Publishing Co., New York and Buffalo, 1911, Vol. IV; pg. 346, 348, 350f and 366)
 The New York Red Book by Edgar L. Murlin (1903; pg. 146)

1869 births
1929 deaths
Republican Party New York (state) state senators
People from Mooers, New York
Republican Party members of the New York State Assembly
Town supervisors in New York (state)